The Republican Party of Shelby County is the Republican political organization for Shelby County, Tennessee.  It has a long history of impacting politics in Shelby County long before the Republican Party was popular in the south.

Despite being in a heavily Democratic county, the Republican Party of Shelby County is the largest county Republican Party in the state. Though Tennessee does not register by party, it is estimated that there are roughly 272,000 Republican voters in Shelby County.

History
The party has its origins in the Lincoln League, which was founded by Robert Church Jr. in 1916 to promote black voter registration. Church was one of the most prominent African-American businessmen in the nation and is credited with the early development of Beale Street. By the 1950s conservative Democrats were joining the party as blacks were leaving.

In the 1970s the party remade itself as a suburb-focused party that relied on activities like backyard parties, door-to-door campaigning and telephone networks to coordinate conservative voters in the suburbs.

Starting in 1992, the party began holding a primary election to pick candidates in the general election. It was scheduled for the same day as Tennessee's presidential primary, and represented the first partisan local elections in the County since before 1900. The county Democratic party soon copied the practice. The move meant the end of nearly a century of nonpartisan elections in the county.

Chairpersons

References

External links
Republican Party of Shelby County
RPSC History

Shelby County, Tennessee
Political parties established in 1916
1916 establishments in Tennessee